Rana Afzaal Hussain (born 2 July 1947) is a Pakistani politician who had been a member of the National Assembly of Pakistan, from 2008 to May 2018.

Early life
He was born on 2 July 1947.

Political career
He ran for the seat of the National Assembly of Pakistan as an independent candidate from NA-131 (Sheikhupura-I) in 2002 Pakistani general election but was unsuccessful. He received 3,075 votes and lost the seat to Zulfiqar Ahmad Dhillon.

He was elected to the National Assembly as a candidate of Pakistan Muslim League (N) (PML-N) from Constituency NA-131 (Sheikhupura-I) in by-election held in June 2008. He received 119,180 votes and defeated Zulfiqar Ahmed Dhillon. The seat became vacant after Rana Tanveer Hussain who won the 2008 election, vacated it to retain the seat in NA-132.

He was re-elected to the National Assembly as a candidate of PML-N from Constituency NA-131 (Sheikhupura-I) in 2013 Pakistani general election. He received 73,742 votes and defeated an independent candidate, Umer Aftab Dhillon. In the same election, he also ran for the seat of the National Assembly as an independent candidate from Constituency NA-132 (Sheikhupura-II) but was unsuccessful. He received 1,231 votes and lost the seat to Rana Tanveer Hussain.

References

Living people
Pakistan Muslim League (N) politicians
Punjabi people
1947 births
Pakistani MNAs 2008–2013
Pakistani MNAs 2013–2018